Breg pri Kočevju is a settlement on the left bank of the Rinža River north of Kočevje in southern Slovenia. The area is part of the traditional region of Lower Carniola and is now included in the Southeast Slovenia Statistical Region.

Name
Breg pri Kočevju was attested in written sources as Rain in 1494. The German common noun Rain means 'marge; bank' and semantically corresponds to the Slovene name Breg (literally, 'bank'), both referring to the village's location on the bank of the Rinža River. The name of the settlement was changed from Breg to Breg pri Kočevju in 1953.

Notable people
Notable people that were born or lived in Breg pri Kočevju include:
Ivan Erker (a.k.a. Johann Erker), nom de guerre Goldšmid (1895–1953), Gottschee German communist politician

References

External links

Breg pri Kočevju on Geopedia
Pre–World War II map of Breg pri Kočevju with oeconyms and family names

Populated places in the Municipality of Kočevje